WVOY-LP (98.9 FM) is a low-power radio station broadcasting a religious music format. Licensed to Jefferson, South Carolina, United States, the station is currently owned by The Church of God, Inc. Emmanuel.

References

External links
 

VOY-LP
Chesterfield County, South Carolina
VOY-LP